is the 42nd single by Hello! Project unit Morning Musume. The single was released on February 10, 2010 with three limited edition releases as well as the normal edition– "A", "B" and "C"– all of which contained a different DVD. All four editions (including normal) also contained a special card with a serial number on it, which was used in an event draw. The Single V was released on February 24, 2010. This is also the group's first single as an eight-member unit, since the graduation of seventh generation member Koharu Kusumi in late 2009.

The theme of the title track is a comparison between women and flowers.

Track listings

CD 
 
Programming: Hideyuki "Daichi" Suzuki / Drums: Toshiyuki Takao / Violin: Crusher Kimura / E. guitar & A. guitar: Koji Kamada / Chorus: Ai Takahashi
 
Programming & guitar: AKIRA / Chorus: Ai Takahashi, Eri Kamei
 "Onna ga Medatte Naze Ikenai (Instrumental)"

DVD

Limited A 
 "Onna ga Medatte Naze Ikenai (Dance Shot Ver.)"

Limited B 
 "Onna ga Medatte Naze Ikenai (Close-up Ver.)"

Limited C 
 "Onna ga Medatte Naze Ikenai (Make-up Ver.)"

Single V 
 "Onna ga Medatte Naze Ikenai"
 "Onna ga Medatte Naze Ikenai (Stage Ver.)"

Featured lineup 
 5th generation: Ai Takahashi, Risa Niigaki 
 6th generation: Eri Kamei, Sayumi Michishige, Reina Tanaka
 8th generation: Aika Mitsui, Junjun, Linlin

Onna ga Medatte Naze Ikenai

Main Voc: Ai Takahashi, Reina Tanaka

Center Voc: Risa Niigaki, Eri Kamei

Minor Voc: Sayumi Michishige, Aika Mitsui, Junjun, Linlin

Nakidasu Kamo Shirenai yo

Main Voc: Ai Takahashi, Risa Niigaki, Eri Kamei, Reina Tanaka

Center Voc: Junjun

Minor Voc: Sayumi Michishige, Aika Mitsui,  Linlin

Chart positions

References

External links 
 Onna ga Medatte Naze Ikenai entry on the Hello! Project website 

2010 singles
Morning Musume songs
Song recordings produced by Tsunku
Songs written by Tsunku
Zetima Records singles
2009 songs
Dance-pop songs
Japanese synth-pop songs